The Rural Municipality of Tramping Lake No. 380 is a rural municipality (RM) in the Canadian province of Saskatchewan within Census Division No. 13 and  Division No. 6.

History 
The RM of Tramping Lake No. 380 incorporated as a rural municipality on December 12, 1910.

Geography

Communities and localities 
The following urban municipalities are surrounded by the RM.

Towns
 Scott

The following unincorporated communities are within the RM.

Localities
 Revenue (dissolved as a village, November 1, 1967)
 Tako

Demographics 

Attractions 
 Scott Experimental Farm

Government 
The RM of Tramping Lake No. 380 is governed by an elected municipal council and an appointed administrator that meets on the first Wednesday after the first Monday of every month. The reeve of the RM is Peter Volk while its administrator is Stacy Hawkins. The RM's office is located in Scott.

Transportation 
 Saskatchewan Highway 14
 Saskatchewan Highway 21
 Saskatchewan Highway 374
 Saskatchewan Highway 659

See also 
List of rural municipalities in Saskatchewan

References 

Tramping Lake

Division No. 13, Saskatchewan